The  1907–08 SEGAS Championship was the third championship organized by SEGAS.

Overview
Goudi Athens won the championship.

Teams
All 4 teams were either from Athens or Piraeus, despite it being called a Panhellenic Championship, which would imply the competition was nationwide.

References
rsssf

 

Panhellenic Championship seasons
Greece
1907–08 in Greek football